The Chevrolet One-Fifty (or 150) was the economy/fleet model of the Chevrolet car from 1953 until 1957.  It took its name by shortening the production series number (1500) by one digit in order to capitalize on the numerical auto name trend of the 1950s.  The numerical designation "150" was also sporadically used in company literature. It replaced the Styleline Special model available in previous years. This model was dropped following the 1957 model year and replaced by the Delray.

History 
The One-Fifty was mainly conceived as a fleet model and little effort was spent marketing it to the average car buyer of the day, although sales weren't limited to fleets. It was most popular with police, state governments, small businesses, economy-minded consumers and hot rodders. Chevrolet sold substantially fewer One-Fifties than Two-Tens or the Chevrolet Bel Air in every year of its life.

True to Chevrolet's vision, the 150 was no-frills basic transportation. It had limited options, stark trim, solid colors, plain heavy-duty upholstery and rubberized flooring. Small things like ashtrays, cigarette lighters and even mirrors were extra cost options. Compared to the mid-level Two-Ten or premium Bel Air models, the One-Fifty was stark and bland. 

Body style choices were also limited to sedans, Handyman wagons (four-door in 1953–1954, two-door in 1955–1957) and (until 1955) the club coupe. The only body styles specific to the One-Fifty were decidedly fleet oriented — the sedan delivery (a 2-door wagon without rear windows and the rear seat removed) and the business sedan — a 2-door sedan with immobile rear windows and back seat removed. Powertrain choices were limited to manual transmissions and low output engines until 1954. In 1957, a full race-ready version was also available, commonly known as the "Black Widow" for its black-and-white paint color. It was equipped with 4-wheel heavy-duty brakes, 6-lug wheels and dual shock absorbers.

First generation (1953–1954)

1953–1954 models 

This was the first year for both the One-Fifty and Two-Ten. The two model years were essentially the same, except that the business coupe (short roof) became the Utility Sedan (with a 2-door sedan body) for 1954.  The 150 came only with the base engine in 1953. The 150 came with a horn button, rather than the 210 and upscale Bel Air's horn ring.

Powertrains 
Three engines were used in the 1953–1954 model years, although not all were available at the same time. All One-Fifties in 1953 used a 3-speed Synchromesh manual transmission.  Starting in 1954, Powerglide automatic transmission was available on this series.
235 in3 "Thrift-master" I6 rated at (1953 sedan delivery only)
(1953 standard equipment)
(1954 standard equipment)
235.5 in3 "Blue Flame" I6 7.5:1 CR  (1954 optional equipment)

Second generation (1955–1957)

1955 

The 1955 model year marked the introduction of a new chassis, all new streamlined single bow bodywork, and the debut of Chevrolet's Small Block V8. The One-Fifty buyer was free to choose any powertrain option available. The business sedan was renamed the utility sedan this year. Unlike the 210 and the Bel Air, the 150 did not have any of the stainless-steel trim.

Engines 

1956 
Engine choices remained the same, except for higher power ratings.  The 265 in3 V8 was available in three different versions. The I6 had a new unified build regardless of transmission type.

Engines 
265 in3 "Turbo-Fire" OHV V8 with quad barrel carburetor rated at 
265 in3 "Turbo-Fire" OHV V8 with dual-quad barrel carburetors rated at

1957 
New for 1957 was the 283 in3 small-block V8. The fuel-injected version was theoretically also available to the 150 buyer. The optional Turboglide automatic transmission became available on vehicles equipped with a V8 engine. The 1957 150 had side trim similar to the 1955's Bel Air trim. 56,266 150 four-door sedans were made for 1957, compared to the approximately 75,000 2-door versions.

Engines 
283 in3 "Super Turbo-Fire" OHV V8 with 4-barrel carburetor rated at 
283 in3 "Super Turbo-Fire" OHV V8 with dual 4-barrel carburetors rated at 
283 in3 "Super Turbo-Fire" OHV V8 with Rochester Ram-Jet fuel injection rated at

See also
Chevrolet Nomad
Tri-Five
Chevrolet 210
Chevrolet Bel Air

References 

Cars introduced in 1953
150
Motor vehicles manufactured in the United States